Marion Junction may refer to:

Marion Junction, Alabama, an unincorporated community
Marion Junction (New Jersey), a railroad junction